Stirling Highway is, for most of its length, a four-lane single carriageway and major arterial road between Perth, Western Australia and the port city of Fremantle in Western Australia on the northern side of the Swan River. East of Crawley, it continues as Mounts Bay Road which links Crawley and the nearby University of Western Australia to the Perth central business district.

The highway passes through several of Perth's western suburbs, such as Nedlands, Claremont, Peppermint Grove, Cottesloe and Mosman Park. It also passes the University of Western Australia in Crawley, and several private secondary schools - namely Christ Church Grammar School, Presbyterian Ladies' College and Methodist Ladies' College. In addition, major shopping areas exist at Claremont and Cottesloe, while many smaller businesses and retailers are dotted along the highway. The section of road from Cottesloe leading south runs alongside the railway.

History
Stirling Highway initially developed as a rough track linking the new townsites of Perth and Fremantle following the establishment of the Swan River Colony in 1829. Construction of a formal road along the track's alignment did not take place for several decades, due to labour shortages, the slow initial development of the colony, the initial absence of a bridge across the Swan River at the southern end of the track, and the use of the river itself as the principal means of transport between the towns.

Convict labour was used to construct the road after the colony was constituted as a penal settlement in 1850, and this was completed by 1858. The road was declared a public highway in 1881.

The Perth to Fremantle railway line was completed in 1881, running alongside the road for part of its length. This spurred the development of Perth's western suburbs, including land alongside the road.

The road was known as the Perth-Fremantle Road until 1932, when it was renamed for the first Governor of Western Australia, Admiral Sir James Stirling. Construction of the modern highway was formally commenced in the 1930s. The schedule was as follows:
1934 - Broadway, Nedlands to Weld Street, Nedlands
1935 - Weld Street, Nedlands to Bay View Terrace, Claremont
1936 - Bay View Terrace, Claremont to Anstey Street, Claremont
1937 - Anstey Street, Claremont to Johnston Street, Peppermint Grove
1938 - Johnston Street, Peppermint Grove to Leighton Crossing, North Fremantle
1939 - Leighton Crossing, North Fremantle to Fremantle, including the new Fremantle Traffic Bridge

At the peak of trams and trolleybuses in metropolitan Perth (from the 1930s to the early 1950s) several routes ran along Stirling Highway, and steel poles along the edge of the highway were used to hold the required wiring. Following the dismantling of the tramways, the remaining poles became rusty and quite unsightly, and most were removed in the early 2000s as part of the underground power project.

In the 1970s, a new crossing of the Swan River was constructed slightly to the east of the Fremantle Traffic Bridge. Named the Stirling Bridge, it was opened in 1974 by Premier Charles Court. The highway was rerouted to the new bridge, and terminated at Canning Highway. The new bridge was part of a longer-term proposal to construct a new bypass of central Fremantle.

An extension further south from Canning Highway to High Street was opened on 26 November 1985 by the federal and state Ministers for Transport, Peter Morris and Julian Grill. The cost of the project reached A$5.5m, including the compulsory acquisition and demolition of 90 homes. The project was jointly funded by the state and federal governments and was designed by consulting engineers, Airey, Ryan and Hill for the Main Roads Department, who undertook construction of the highway. This section represented the first part of the planned Fremantle Eastern Bypass. Those plans have since been cancelled, and High Street represents Stirling Highway's permanent southern/western terminus.

Major intersections
All intersections below are controlled by traffic signals unless otherwise mentioned.

See also

 Highways in Australia
 List of highways in Western Australia
 List of major roads in Perth, Western Australia

References

Further reading

External links

Main Roads Western Australia

 
Highways and freeways in Perth, Western Australia
Crawley, Western Australia
Naming controversies
Nedlands, Western Australia
Claremont, Western Australia
Cottesloe, Western Australia
Articles containing video clips